Yaya Diallo is a musician and author from the Republic of Mali.

Background

Yaya Diallo was born in 1946 in the village of Fienso (French Sudan) now Mali, to a nomadic Fula father and a Minianka mother.  Yaya was raised in a culture that works, worships, lives and breathes to the beat of the drum. His mother's ties to the Berthe family (including hunters, county chiefs, musicians...) afforded young Yaya the opportunity to hear some of the best musicians of the former canton Zangasso. The musician, healer and sorcerer Nangape Kone was his protector and mentor.

Arriving in Montreal, Canada, in 1967, Yaya graduated from the University of Montreal in Chemistry in 1973.  Following a brief career as a chemist, Yaya returned to traditional African music.  He was a co-founder of the music and dance groups Djembe-Kan and Cleba, a member of the African Troubadours with the World Music Institute, as well as a faculty member with the Creative Music Studio, Woodstock, NY, and the Omega Institute.

Yaya has taught Applied World Percussion at Bellarmine University in Louisville, KY and offers workshops in traditional African healing, music and dance. He was a seasonal lecturer at Carlton University, teaching Aural Training I & II from 1987 to 1992 and also worked for Multiculturalism at Schools and the Community (MASC) in Ontario and Quebec, Canada, teaching more than 6000 students per year.  From 1974 to 1986, he was a staff member of the Intercultural Institute of Montreal, Canada, organizing workshops and lectures about the diverse cultures living in Montreal, covering topics ranging from Alternative Medicine to Aging to Music.

He has performed throughout the US, Canada, Asia (Japan, Singapore), Europe (France, England, and Belgium).

Biography 

Early Years

In his book, The Healing Drum, Yaya Diallo wrote about his mother and her famous family of Zangasso, but not about his nomadic heritage. His great-grandfather's name was Yoro Diallo and when Yaya went to Fienso he changed his family name to Sountoura, which is interchangeable with Diallo. In some parts of West Africa, Fula people (Fulani;) are not welcomed, especially the Diallo family.  To be accepted in Fienso, Yaya Diallo's ancestors were sponsored by a Minianka family called Zango-o with the last name Kone, establishing a special relationship between the two families.

Yaya Diallo's family was semi-nomadic.  Some stayed in Fienso and others were nomadic in the hostile Miniankala.  Minianka farmers hated Fula people because their animals destroyed crops and young plants.  To travel, Fula people were initiated into the secret societies.  Yaya Diallo's grandfather, Flantio, was powerful and feared by everyone, it was reputed that when he touched you with his magic stick, you got diarrhea.  Flantio resumed using the name Diallo.  He married Yaya's grandmother,  Kone, a midwife from the Kone family of the village Ziena. 

A marabout (seer) Fula made a prophecy to Flantio saying that one of his grandsons would be well known in the world using paper and sound.  This was similar to the prophesy they made to his mother.  At that time, most of Minianka had never seen a piece of paper.

His Father

Yaya Diallo's father, Sibo Diallo, was a Nia Messenger (and a medium) from his birthday until 1974 when he became Muslim. During Nia Society rituals, he went into a trance while his brother played Nia Ngoni (African bass guitar). In a trance, Yaya's father would predict the future of the village, including diseases, bad weather, disasters, death, gender of babies in their mother's womb, with a surprising accuracy. He knew a lot of medicinal herbs and for each disease, he recommended the herbs to use. He mentored Nia Borotali (the messengers of Nia), and could read and translate the 266 characters of Nia. He died on April 19, 1995. Yaya Diallo's mother died on February 2, 1997.

Nomadic life (1950-1953)

The male children in Diallo's family had to live a nomadic life from age four to 21 years. Female children lived nomadically from age six until she was married at 16 or after.

To survive in nature, Yaya Diallo learned useful things: to be strong, to listen (for the sound of hungry lions, hyenas, etc), to observe (for snakes, scorpions), to smell (deadly smells).  He learned the paradox of nature which is: a plant near a poisonous plant often has an antidote for the poison.  Many human diseases have their medications in nature. Yaya Diallo's knowledge included medications found in nature that can cure or stop the symptoms of some illnesses:  diarrhea, flu, headaches, and the bites or stings of scorpions, snakes, bees, and wasps.  His family bred cattle and sheep and were always moving, looking for some good place where the animals could get good grass and water and where insects would not transmit infectious diseases. They built temporary huts near villages.  The women went to the villages to sell or trade dairy products and to buy rice, fish, and flour.  

Predators such as hyenas and lions attacked the animals and the shepherds would hunt them away. When an animal is killed, other animals would become stressed, and sometimes the shepherds called musicians to play so the predators went away.

In nature, Diallo had time to observe and learn about animals (predators, birds, reptiles, herbivores, and all kinds of insects) and plants , as a result, Diallo was knowledgable about biology and medical herbs.

Values

To be a successful man, one should put a lot of big, heavy necklaces around his wife's neck and hang big golden earrings from her ears, as well as having many cattle and sheep.  

In 1953, Diallo went to French school at Zangasso, his mother's native village.  During school, Diallo was sedentary.  As soon as school stopped he re-joined the nomadic people.  When he came to North America, that was the end of his former nomadic life, but as a musician he loves traveling.  He said, "The school of traveling is unique.  You can not learn in books what you learn when you travel."
  
Western education

Diallo attended French school from 1953 to 1959, despite French school being considered to be a curse for villagers.  The villagers predicted that Yaya Diallo would not stay in school for two years, "he is not even good enough to be black, how can he succeed in the white man's school?"  In 1959, his teacher Arouna Dembele believed Yaya Diallo could succeed in the contest required to go to Lycees and colleges, but he failed the contest. From 1959 to 1960, he came back to school and succeeded in the contest and went to the College Moderne of Sikasso. He successfully got the D.E.F: Diploma of Fundamental Studies in 1964. To help his mother, he wanted to study to become a teacher, but his mother refused his request.  Instead, he was oriented to biological studies (mathematics, physics, chemistry, biology).  In 1966, he succeeded in both writing and oral exams and obtained the first part of Baccalaureal Francais (Malien). In 1967, the last year of secondary school, he was one of the best students in biology which meant he could have a scholarship from the World Health Organization to go to medical school in France. Instead, in April 1967, Yaya Diallo accepted a scholarship from Canada to become a Sanitary Engineer.  

He came to Montreal on September 22, 1967, two weeks before the mid-term exams. In 1968–69, he passed all exams except technical drawing.  Canadian government recommended him to go to intensive drawing class, but he refused the request and lost his scholarship. His girlfriend's father, manager of Stuart Biscuit, gave him a job in the factory, and he later began to study organic chemistry in order to understand the chemical products in herbs and plants. From 1969 to 1970 he was working nights and attending school in the daytime. In October 1970, he stopped his education due to Montreal's October Revolution. Recomencing in 1973, Diallo got his bachelor's diploma in organic chemistry.

Brief career as a chemist - University of Montreal (May–September 1973)

After graduation he was hired by Dr. Robert Marchesseault, Head of the Department of Chemistry, to determine how to make waterproof paper from rolls of paper in movement.  Diallo had to determine the time required for each stage of treating the paper, and the quantities of the various materials. Yaya said, "I like this project.  I studied chemistry to get my hands wet.  I like the technical aspect of sciences.  I want to make products." [citation needed]

He interrupted his career to apply for the Canadian government waiver for illegal aliens.

Interruption

In August 1973, Diallo learned of a program for illegal aliens and especially for students. He registered as a student at H.E.C. (Hautes Etudes Commerciales), a business school, and filed the requested papers to stay in Canada. For eight months, the immigration officers gave him a hard time. In March 1974, he received an order to leave Canada or he would be deported in two days. However, he met the right people at the right time and was given permission to stay in Canada. He became an immigrant in 1974 and a Canadian citizen in 1983.

Second short career as a chemist

In 1975, Diallo was ready to go back home to Mali. In the newspaper he saw a contest in which the winner would get a job at the Department of Geology at the University du Quebec in Montreal.  He won the contest and was hired to work with a double collector mass spectrograph, which could be a useful project for people living in desert countries. According to the literature, this new technique could be used to estimate the age of water trapped underground.  Every six months, a sample was taken and analyzed.  If the age was the same, that meant that there was no new source of water to that specific location.  People who use wells in the desert could be  warned that one day they would lack water.  When the differences changed, that meant that there was new water, so people could use the water without worries. 

Musical career

Yaya Diallo said, "For my people, with its rich musical context, exposure to music begins in the wombs when pregnant mothers join in the community dance...when infants are then wrapped onto their mother's backs with a cloth and taken into the dancing circle with everyone else."  This statement is quoted by Mickey Hart in his book Planet Drum, pp. 88.  Yaya Diallo's first music and dance lessons included exploring the balafons which were kept in his paternal family  In his native village, Fienso, he learned Peenyi (Dounou), spiritual balafon, morals, proverbs, and philosophy with his mentor Nangape Kone.  Sounkalo Kone and Issa Koroma gave him djembe (daykaylaykay) lessons.  Yago Kone was his biology and Moukolo (equivalent of Congo) teacher.  In Zangasso his grandfather taught him hand and stick drum techniques, and after his death, his grandfather continued to teach him music and wisdom in his dreams.   Sotigui Kone was his religious tama (talking) drum teacher.  When he was six years old, Yaya Diallo had his first drum sculpted by the blacksmith Nianso Koroma.  He formed his first music group with the goals and dreams to impress his grandfather. 

In order to live with Minianka people, Yaya Diallo had several initiations. He learned the music and the instruments which go with each step of the rituals, always interested in the religious and mystical aspects of the music. In the different secret societies, he played the instrument that sustained the rhythm and/or tempo.

As a shepherd, Yaya Diallo used his body, pieces of wood and stones as musical instruments.  During the day he listened to musicians from different villages playing as motivation for groups of collective farmers to work quickly.  He listened to birds, insects, and by nights, orchestras of frogs.

In Sikasso, the capitol of balafons, he listened to the finest players (1960–61). In Bamako, djembe is the main instrument, and for his six years at the Lycee, he heard great djembe players.  

Musical career in Montreal, Canada (1976-78)

Yaya Diallo quit his job and met Alama Kanate from Côte d'Ivoire, and with two Senegaleses Boubacar Gueye and Moustapha Seck, they founded a band called Djeme-kan.  The group performed for weddings and cultural events without good results. The Senegaleses abandoned the group and were replaced by a Congolese guitarist and singer, and Alain Tagny, a dancer from Cameroun. After two successful nights at the National Bibliothèque de Montreal, Alama Kanate claimed that the group belonged to him. Which resulted in Djeme-kan dividing in two parts.

Yaya Diallo and Alain Tagny created Cleba, which means "the sun is shining for everyone", and white people were accepted in the group. Cleba was successful and played the main stage for big events such as the St. John Baptist Celebration. In May 1978, the group did a tour in Saguenay-Lac-Saint-Jean outside of Montreal which was a fiasco. The most important thing was that in the 1970s, French Canadians were not ready to see white men playing African instruments and white women dancing to African music. When Cleba came back to Montreal, they lost the motivation to continue and quit the group.

Hard time in his life

From October 1977-February 1978, Diallo survived on unemployment funds and then sold Grolier Encyclopedias door to door. Through 1979, he was dating Helen Alemany, his son Teli Diallo's mother, and teaching drum classes at the space they had rented for Cleba. He was also jamming at La Grande Passe on Ontario Street and Chez Dumas on Emery Street.  At the Centre Monchanin, later the Intercultural Institute of Montreal, he started to teach African dance to a group of women.  In 1980, at the end of the project, Diallo was hired to work at the center. He continued to work part-time and from 1980 to 1987, was a staff member and Treasurer of the board.  

In 1980, Yaya Diallo recorded his first LP record, produced by Stephen Conroy through his company Onzou Records. The LP release was done at multiple venues in March and April 1981 and the phenomenon of Yaya Diallo was born in Montreal. Karl Parent, a journalist of CBC International was amazed by what he heard at L'Improvu and offered Yaya Diallo the opportunity to make music for the documentary film Leopold Cedar Senghor, Former President of Senegal. The film was presented at CBC TV on Tuesday, May 1981. (See TV program. Ici Radio-Canada, Vol. 5, no. 22)

Also in 1980, Diallo met Madame Dominique de Menil from Houston, Texas, who tasked him with a difficult mission. On June 20, 1981, he would play the appropriate rhythm or beats as a reward for ten people or organizations at The Rothko Chapel Rewards in Recognition of Commitment to Truth and Freedom. For example, for Las Madres de La Playa de Mayo, Buenos Aires, Argentina, he played the rhythm for people who had lost men, women, children. For Warren Robbins, son of Jewish immigrants from Ukraine, founder and director of the Museum of African Arts in Washington, D.C., who had accomplished a mission impossible, Yaya Diallo played a special music for brave people. When the journalist Zwelakhe Sisulu's name was announced, Diallo played a beat for courage and motivation. 

Warren Robbins had been impressed by Yaya Diallo and, in December 1981, invited him for some events in Washington, D.C.  Diallo met leaders of the Black community (today called African Americans), especially the group of African Heritage. He and Pascal Milogo performed an Evening of Balafon music at the Smithsonian Museum in Washington, DC, on December 27, 1981, sponsored by the National Museum of Art's African Art program. To meet Africans living in Washington, D.C. he did a Balafon concert at "The Baobab", a popular Malian restaurant.

He was also invited to speak on La Voix de l'Amerique, a radio show hosted by George Collinet, although,  he did not speak with George Collinet who was on vacation. Diallo's message was broadcast to 250 countries: "Young people, build your own country, there is no room for everybody in the USA.  American youth should not be your role models."

Creative Music Studio, Woodstock, NY, CMS

During 1981, Diallo conducted drum workshops and performed with his group from Montreal. He performed at CMS Summer Festival '81:  World music on Sunday July 12 '81 as "Yaya Diallo from Mali".  People such as John Abercrombie, Karl Beger, Chick Corea, Dave Holland, Ingrid, Jack de Johnette, Pat Metheny, Charlie Haden, and Dewey Redman had performed at CMS. Diallo remained a faculty member from 1981 to its end.

Introduction to jazz music

Baikida Carrol, a jazz horn player from St. Louis, invited Yaya Diallo to play with one of his groups at Public Theater NY on Friday November 14, 198?.  The first team called "Bush Wish" included Nana Vasconcellos, Bresil, Yaya Diallo and others.  The second team was composed of Julius Hemphill and Anthony Davis. Randy Weston appeared both nights.  Even though Yaya Diallo said that he knew nothing about jazz, he felt at home in jam sessions with Baikida Carrol, Julius Hempell, Anthony Davis, and others.

Cultural Exchange and Writings

In June 1983, Yaya Diallo participated in a symposium in Namur, Belgium.  That symposium was organized for European scholars and experts in intercultural cooperation by University De La Paix and addressed these questions: What are unifying myths of the world? Who has the right to define the criteria of good life for the world?

In July 1983, he returned to Namur, Belgium, to assist in an intercultural colloquium organized by 200 non-profit organizations from all over the world.  After a week of work using six languages, Yaya Diallo was tasked with writing a French-language report of the symposium, along with his friend Adama Samassekou who was living in Paris, France.  Yaya Diallo returned to Montreal with 10 cassette tapes and completed the work by himself.

In Namur, Yaya Diallo had shared a room with Professor Alpha Oumar Konare, who later became a two-term President of Mali (1992–2002) and was chairperson of the African Union.  In addition, his friend Adama Samassekou was Minister of Education in Mali.   

In September, Yaya Diallo wrote a controversial and critical article about international cooperation in French, entitled, La Cooperation est-elle possible?  (Is Cooperation Possible?)  This article is published in Interculture (October–December 1983, Vol. XVI, No. 4 cahier 81, pp. 9–17).

With a grant from the Ministry of Multiculturalism of Canada, Diallo wrote the Profil Culturel Africain.  This document was first published in 1985 by the Intercultural Institute of Montreal. Teachers, researchers, students, and seekers of exoticism, as well as Africans searching for their roots, have referred to it. In spite of that relative success, it is out of print. In October 2001, it was translated in English as At the Threshold of the African Soul in The Fulani-Minianka Way, Intercultural Issue No. 141. This document is the heart of the book, Healing Drum, African Wisdom Teachings. Diallo's international reputation came from his writings, including Healing Drum, as writing books is his destiny. Diallo said, "I don't want to be associated with a record company." [citation needed]

Music and Multicultural Education

In 1982, as a musician, Diallo played two weeks at CNE (Canadian National Exhibit) in Toronto.  In 1986, he played at the International Exhibit in Vancouver BC, at Folklife, and at Canadian Pavilion.  In 1987, he stopped working at the Institute and started to tour to schools with the program made by the former General Governor of Canada, Jeanne Sauve.  The same year, he started teaching two courses, Aural training I and II, at Carlton University. Diallo also was one of the first artists of the program made by Jan Andrews and Jennifer Cayley: "A Change to Give."  The organization became MASC, Multiculturalism at Schools and Communities.  Diallo worked for MASC from 1988 to 2004.

Diallo did some performances with his band, Kanze, at the Festival Culture Canada 88, at Ottawa-Hull: more than five festivals Nuits d'Afrique with Ballattou; Festival 1001 Nuits; at Club Soda 1989, 1990, The Spectrum de Montreal.

In 1987, Diallo collaborated with others of so-called French-speaking countries to make the song "Franc Parler" for the Summit of Francophony at Quebec City.

The Healing Drum was published in 1989. The president of Inner Traditions, his wife and his staff came to Montreal to meet the community. He bought food for the people of Balattou, for two nights the kanza played. We had a press conference with The Gazette, La Presse, and Voir. After Montreal the company had planned tours for Yaya Diallo. He went to bookstores and Universities, he signed books and did lectures all over the United States. Mickey Hart, the drummer of the Grateful Dead, wrote two books, in which he quoted Diallo's work and gave his opinion about how good he thought The Healing Drum was. The phenomenon of The Healing Drum was born. For several years Diallo did workshops, lectures and debates. The World Music Institute contacted him, he became a member of the artists they manage. They booked him everywhere they could as a solo artist. In 1993 they created the African Troubadours, and they too booked shows everywhere. Other people like Everyone's Drumming with Dounoukan, Relaxation Company, Dombaa Folee had produced Diallo's music, and organized the promotion of the products. 

Additional performances include: 

_An Evening of Balafon Music Featuring Yaya Diallo and Pascal Millogo at the Smithsonian Museum Washington, D.C. Sunday, December 27, 1981. Evening sponsored by National Museum of African Art Program.

_Harrison Festival of the Arts. July 21, 1988 Yaya Diallo, The people who attended your workshops were very pleased, and the afternoon concert was great. It was definitely one of the highlights. Phyllis Wilson, executive director. Hot Springs, BC, Canada.

_1988, The two founders of MASC, Jan Andrews and Jennifer Cayley, had organized a big festival called "Culture Canada" at Park Lauier Located at Hull Quebec. Like other people working for MASC, Diallo was asked to offer his workshop "Music without Money." With Stones, pieces of wood, small pipelines, bamboo sticks, children learned how to make quickly the instruments, and how to play together as an orchestra. The Queen Mother Elisabeth II of England in visit in Canada wanted to see the workshops made by people from different cultures. The Queen accompanied by the Prime Minister of Canada, Bryan Mulroney arrived to Yaya Diallo workshop, she was happy to see how one could make children happy with stones, woods.... She hanged her hand to shake Diallo's hand, Diallo did not understand, the cameras took the image of the Queen's hands hanging in the air. That was the embarrassing part. Back to Montreal, Diallo's friends teased him, are you a separatist French Canadian. The RCMP did a background check of all participants. They did the something with children's parents before they chose them. For a week Diallo did workshops and shows on small stages. The last day there was the big show where ten groups from different cultures had to play one piece of music together. Diallo's band was composed of musicians from Haiti.

_World Music Institute. African Troubadours, Hassan Hakmoun, James Makubuya, Foday Musa Suso, Yaya Diallo, had its debut as a touring unit during African American History month in 1994. The four sites in California including Humbold State University, Arcadia, University of California, Berkeley; University of California, Santa Cruz, University of California San Diego; as well as Colorado State University, Fort Collings.

_A World of Percussion: Sat. June 8, 1995. Featuring Don Cherry, Glen Velez, Foday Musa Suso, Adam Rudolph, Michel MerHej, Hanna MerHej, Yaya Diallo, Ayib Dieng and Zakir Hussain at Symphony Space, NYC, NY info. World Music Institute NYC, NY.

_Music for People. Workshops in Music Making, Drumming, and Dancing. Featuring David Darling, Yaya Diallo, Glen Velez, Uleikha. October 4–5, 1995. Sacred Heart University, Fairfield, Connecticut.

_World Music Institute Features African Troubadours: Hassan Hakmoun, James Makubuya, Musa Foday Suso, Yaya Diallo at Town Hall NYC, NY. June 1996.

_Best Bets. World Beat. Yaya Diallo teams up with three other leading African musicians to form African Troubadors. Museum of civilization hosts top African Musicians on Friday, January 31, 1997, Canada.

_Drumming in the New Millennium. At the Pyramids of Egypt. West African Yaya Diallo Mali. December 6, 1999.

_African Family Festival at the Louisville Zoo. May 29–31, 1999. Don't miss the festival featuring Yaya Diallo in concert May 31, 5pm.

_Sivananda Millennium World Peace Pilgrimage. London, England. October 25–30, 1999. Featuring Yaya Diallo, Concerts, Drumming and Dance Workshop. Sivananda Yoga Centre. London, England.

_The Healing Drum with Yaya Diallo Concert: Sounds of Africa. December 19, 1999. Drumming, Dance, and Singing workshops December 20–22, 1999. Concert and Dance with Yaya Diallo and company December 23, 1999. Sivananda Ashram Yoga Camp. Val Morin Quebec Canada.

_Sivananda Millennium World Peace Pilgrimage. At Sivananda Ashram Yoga Retreat. Paradise Island, The Bahamas. Featuring Yaya Diallo: Concerts, Drumming and Dance Workshop. From December 25, 1999 – January 1, 2000.

_Sivananda Yogalife. Winter 2000. Millennium World Peace Pilgrimage. The Peace MIssion continues into the 21st Century. African Music and Dance by Yaya Diallo, p. 9.

_American Orf-Schulwork Association, 2003. National Conference at Louisville, KY. Nov. 12–16, 2003. Three events with master drummer Yaya Diallo from Mali.
_The last concert and workshop sponsored by World Music Institute for African Troubadours including Yaya Diallo was on Feb. 25 at the U.C. San Diego; year 2000.

_Workshops. Yaya Diallo West African Drumming Performances and Workshops. Multiculturalism at School and Communities. MASC. Guest Artist and Artist in Residence for 12 years (see brochure 2003–04, p. 15)

_Village Awards March 27, 2004 Community Service/Arts, Yaya Diallo; The Healing Drum by the Godfather of Village Awards, Councilman George Unseld (6th District) Louisville, KY.

No year in text:

_African Troubadours featuring Hassan Hakmoun, James Makubuya, Yaya Diallo. Traditional music of Morocco, Uganda, Mali, sponsored by the World Music Institute. Sterling and Francine; Clark Art Institute Williamstown Mass. www.clarkwilliams.edu.

_Mike's Spicks. Yaya Diallo leads workshops in West African drum and dance in Woodstock NY. Roots of Rhythm: Get 50-60 men and women together, each thumping a drum, led by a master whose chops and knowledge go all the way back to the roots of rhythm and you've got the resonance of heaven, the apotheosis of good vibrations. That's what any serious percussionist or student of African dance can expect this weekend as Yaya Diallo returns to the Woodstock to conduct another series of workshops. By David Arneir a Woodstock pianist and percussionist, Yaya's Balafon student.

_He's got the beat. Glengarry students treated to some African charisma. Yaya Diallo introduced his drums to Iona Academy on March 8, Martintown Public School on March 9, and to Williamstown Public School, and Char-Lin District High School March.

_Yukon Storytelling Festival 1994. Mainstage Performance; The Heart of the Festival: Why will say, yes, yes. Yaya Diallo and Jan Andrews. This was offered at two levels. Ages 5–7, and ages 8 and up.

_NY Open Center NYC, NY. Yaya Diallo African Drumming and Dance from Mali. Saturday and Sunday July 28 and 29 pg. 48 Yaya Concert p. 50.

_World Music Institute presents. A world of percussion featuring Don Cherry, Ed Blackwell, Nana Vasconcelos, Yaya Diallo. June 6, at Symphony Space Broadway and 95th St. NYC, NY.

_Creative Music Studio. Summer Festivals 81. Yaya Diallo from Mali. People as JOhn Abercrombie, Karl Beger, Chick Corea, Dave Holland, Ingrid, Jack de Johnette, Pat Metheny had performed at the same festivals.

Performances with citations include: 

_"Yaya Diallo Performed at the Student Center as a Part of Celebrating Diversity"; Kentucky Kernel, University of Kentucky, Lexington. February 27, 1992.

_"Yaya Diallo Tells African Stories at Yukon Storytelling Festival 1994," June 29, 1994, The Yukon News. p. 19.

_"Champ meeting, Former Heavyweight Champion Muhammad Ali Greeted Drummer Yaya Diallo at Dunbar Community Center in Lexington, KY." February 1995. The Courier Journal.

_One Thunder. Yaya Diallo and 80 drummers from all over the world. World Trade Organization at Singapore. December 13, 1996. pp. 1 and 12. Program: Television Corporation of Singapore.

_Drumming: Dancing is the Other Healing Art. In Yaya Diallo's Tradition, music is a remedy for psychological and physical problems. From page B1 Citilighte Thursday January 30, 1997, Ottawa. Canada.

_Troubadours Teach Culture. Black HIstory month starts with music. African Troubadours at the Canadian Museum of Civilization. The concert features Hassan Hakmoun, James Makubuya, Adam Rudolph, Vieux Diop. Another one of the key elements of the group is Mali's Yaya Diallo, who was in town yesterday to conduct workshops at a couple of schools before the big show. The Ottawa Sun, Vol. 9, No. 61. Ottawa Friday. January 31, 1997. By Ric Overall. Canada.

_African Dancing and Drumming. When Yaya Diallo plays, the entire body hears. Rowe Camp and Conference Center, Rowe Mass. No 12-14, 1999.

_"African Drumer Brings Music to Students." Yaya Diallo works with Boyd County Middle School students. He will be at school for several days as artist in residence. The Daily Independent, Ashland, KY. January 23, 2002. pp. 1 and 12, by Beth Goins.

_"Schools Kick off Black History Month." Buckner Elementary School. The Courier Journal, Neighborhoods, February 6, 2002, by Tonia Holbrook

_Drumming: Dancing is the Other Healing Art. In Yaya Diallo's Tradition, music is a remedy for psychological and physical problems. From page B1 Citilighte Thursday January 30, 1997, Ottawa. Canada.

_Lexington Wellness Center. Percussion with Passion. African master drums up enthusiasm. Yaya Diallo demonstrated some of the finer points of African drumming in a workshop at the Lexington Wellness Center. Drumming is more than the rhythm to the Mali native. See Drumming B3, Local News, 23, 1997 Lexington, KY.

_Mirror: Books Rhythm of life. The Healing Drum African Wisdom teachings. By his account, Yaya Diallo was born in foolish Union. Mirror, Montreal Canada. August 16–23, 1990 Vol. 6, p. 27 By Andrew Jones.

_Don't try to impress Yaya Diallo Ginaw Bone Indian. Mali drummer Yaya Diallo tells with one beat of the drum what level of drummer he is teaching. The Harold-Times, Vol. 115, no. 75. Bloomington, Indiana. By Kathleen Mills.

_Omega Institute. Celebrating 25 years, At the threshold of the African soul, Village Voice. By Yaya Diallo. Drum and Dance Workshops and Concert. July 22–26, pp. 56. Omega May–October 2002 Rhenebeck, NY.

_Centre College. Danville, KY. African voices festival celebrates African and African-American culture. Events include and evening of music from Mali by Yaya Diallo, a musician and author. He will do two workshops, drumming and dance in Vahikamp Theater and a concert of January 14. Diallo will also talk and perform at a program titled "The Healing Drum African Wisdom Teachings". Center News, January 6, 2011, Kathy Nelsen.

Books
1985 At the Threshold of the African Soul: The Fulani-Minianka Way / A Village Voice
A Journal published by the Intercultural Center of Montreal
1989 The Healing Drum: African Wisdom Teachings (Destiny Books)
2001 Reprint journal At the Threshold of the African Soul

Articles and reviews
Introduction to Djembe Drum Music Articles
Bellarmine Article About Yaya Diallo
From Africa to the World, Yaya Diallo Unleashes His Music
The History of African Music
The Meaning of Music
Effects of Sound
The Destruction of African Culture
Djembe Drum Music
The Spiritual Significance of Music
Nangape Reviews
Dounoukan Reviews
Live at Club Soda Reviews
The Healing Drum Book Reviews
The Healing Drum CD Reviews
The Truth About The Healing Drum
La cooperation est-elle possible?
Killing The Ego (Yoga Life)

Awards

1986—Awarded by the Commissioner General of Section for Canada, recognizing his services rendered to the Canada Pavilion during the 1986 World Exposition Vancouver, British Columbia.
2005—Entertainer of the Year, awarded by the African People's Intercontinental Awards.
2008—Mosaic Award, Louisville, KY.

Discography
 The Healing Drum: African Ceremonial and Ritual Music (1994) CD - Destiny Recordings , 
 Dounoukan (1995) CD - Yaya Diallo
 Dombaa Fole: Medicine Music of Mali (1998) CD & audio Cassette - Relaxation Company , 
 Nangape (2003) CD - Onzou Records
 Live at Club Soda (2003) CD - Onzou Records

References

1  The Power of Music; The Drums of his Country Saved Yaya Diallo ... The Magazine of Bellarmine University.  Spring 2009 pp. 22–25 by Carla Carlton

2  Mosaic Awards, The Jewish Family and Vocational Service.  Louisville.  May 14, 2008.

3  At the Threshold of the African Soul.  An'R Issue 18 August 2003 pp. 14

4  At the Best the Healing Drum is Honest ... Beat Magazine, Vol. no. 4, 1990 "Book Beat" by Jason Fine

5  Yaya Diallo Heals the Spirit, The Oberlin Review, September 22, 1995, by Stephame

6  West African Dance, Music, and Culture Take in Kentucky.  Yaya Diallo plays ... Summer 2005 Magazine:  Arts AerooKenky pp 44–46 by Judy Cato.

Yaya Diallo
7  "Schools Kick off Black History Month."  Buckner Elementary School.  The Courier Journal, Neighborhoods, February 6, 2002, by Tonia Holbrook

8  The Only Representative of Mother Africa in this set is Yaya Diallo ... Down Beat:  The Contemporary Music Magazine.  April 1983.  pg.40.  Editor.

9  Drumming in the New Millennium.  At the Pyramids of Egypt.  West African Yaya Diallo Mali.  December 6, 1999.

10  "Champ meeting, Former Heavyweight Champion Muhammad Ali Greeted Drummer Yaya Diallo at Dunbar Community Center in Lexington, KY."  Feb 1995.  The Courier Journal.

11  "Yaya Diallo Tells African Stories at Yukon Storytelling Festival 1994," June 29, 1994, The Yukon News, p. 19.

12  "African Drumer Brings Music to Students."  Yaya Diallo works with Boyd County Middle School students.  He will be at school for several days as artist in residence. The Daily Independent, Ashland, KY.  January 23, 2002, pp. 1 and 12, by Beth Goins.

13  "Yaya Diallo Performed at the Student Center as a Part of Celebrating Diversity;" Kentucky Kernel, University of Kentucky, Lexington.  February 27, 1992.

14  African Dancing and Drumming.  When Yaya Diallo plays, the entire body hears.  Rowe Camp and Conference Center, Rowe Mass.  No 12-14, 1999.

15  One Thunder.  Yaya Diallo and 80 drummers from all over the world.  World Trade Organization at Singapore.  December 13, 1996.  pp. 1 and 12.  Program:  Television Corporation of Singapore.

16  Music for People.  Workshops in Music Making, Drumming, and Dancing.  Featuring David Darling, Yaya Diallo, Glen Velez, Uleikha.  October 4–5, 1995.  Sacred Heart University, Fairfield, Connecticut.

17  Workshops.  Yaya Diallo West African Drumming Performances and Workshops.  Multiculturalism at School and Communities.  MASC.  Guest Artist and Artist in Residence for 12 years (see brochure 2003–2004, p. 15)

Rhythm and Music Magazine
18  Master Drummer Yaya Diallo.  Fool's Gold:  Percussion Discussion.  Music Global sounds and ideas May/June 1996 pp. 14–17 by David N. Blank-Edelman.

19  Yaya Diallo Entertainer of the Year 2005.  API Award. African People's Intercontinental Awards.  June 4, 2005 at the Washington Convention Center.  Washington, D.C. Program pp 11 and 12.

20  Power of Listening!  Yaya Diallo. Today's Black Woman.  May 1997 by Joy Jones.

21  EBONY.  Ebony Bookshelf.  The Healing Drum, An exploration of the culture of Minianka people (Mali) April 1990.

22  World Music Institute presents.  A world of percussion featuring Don Cherry, Ed Blackwell, Nana Vasconcelos, Yaya Diallo.  June 6, at Symphony Space Broadway and 95th St. NYC, NY.

23  Creative Music Studio.  Summer Festivals 81.  Yaya Diallo from Mali.  People as JOhn Abercrombie, Karl Beger, Chick Corea, Dave Holland, Ingrid, Jack de Johnette, Pat Metheny had performed at the same festivals.

24  Yukon Storytelling Festival 1994.  Mainstage Performance; The Heart of the Festival:  Why will say, yes, yes.  Yaya Diallo and Jan Andrews.  This was offered at two levels.  Ages 5–7, and ages 8 and up.

25  African Family Festival at the Louisville Zoo.  May 29–31, 1999.  Don't miss the festival featuring Yaya Diallo in concert May 31, 5pm.

26  African Troubadours featuring Hassan Hakmoun, James Makubuya, Yaya Diallo.  Traditional music of Morocco, Uganda, Mali sponsored by the World Music Institute.  Sterling and Francine; Clark Art Institute Williamstown Mass.  www.clarkwilliams.edu.

27  World Music Institute.  African Troubadours, Hassan Hakmoun, James Makubuya, Foday Musa Suso, Yaya Diallo, had its debut as a touring unit during African American History month in 1994.  The four sites in California including Humbold State University, Arcadia, University of California, Berkeley; University of California, Santa Cruz, University of California San Diego; as well as Colorado State University, Fort Collings.

28  A World of Percussion:  Sat. June 8, 1995 Featuring Don Cherry, Glen Velez, Foday Musa Suso, Adam Rudolph, Michel MerHej, Hanna MerHej, Yaya Diallo, Ayib Dieng and Zakir Hussain at Symphony Space, NYC, NY info.  World Music Institute NYC, NY.

29  An Evening of Balafon Music Featuring Yaya Diallo and Pascal Millogo at the Smithsonian Museum Washington, D.C. Sunday, Dec. 27, 1981.  Evening sponsored by National Museum of African Art Program.

30  Best Bets.  World Beat.  Yaya Diallo teams up with three other leading African musicians to form African Troubadors.  Museum of civilization hosts top African Musicians on Friday, January 31, 1997, Canada.

31  Troubadours Teach Culture.  Black HIstory month starts with music.  African Troubadours at the Canadian Museum of Civilization.  The concert features Hassan Hakmoun, James Makubuya, Adam Rudolph, Vieux Diop.  Another one of the key elements of the group is Mali's Yaya Diallo, who was in town yesterday to conduct workshops at a couple of schools before the big show.  The Ottawa Sun, Vol. 9, No. 61.  Ottawa Friday.  January 31, 1997.  By Ric Overall.  Canada.

32  Drumming:  Dancing is the Other Healing Art.  In Yaya Diallo's Tradition, music is a remedy for psychological and physical problems.  From page B1 Citilighte Thursday January 30, 1997, Ottawa.  Canada.

33  Lexington Wellness Center.  Percussion with Passion.  African master drums up enthusiasm. Yaya Diallo demonstrated some of the finer points of African drumming in a workshop at the Lexington Wellness Center.  Drumming is more than the rhythm to the Mali native.  See Drumming B3, Local News, 23, 1997 Lexington, KY.

34  Mirror: Books
Rhythm of life.  The Healing Drum African Wisdom teachings.  By his account, Yaya Diallo was born in foolish Union.  Mirror Montreal Canada.  August 16–23, 1990, Vol. 6, pp. 27. By Andrew Jones

35  Don't try to impress Yaya Diallo Ginaw Bone Indian.  Mali drummer Yaya Diallo tells with one beat of the drum what level of drummer he is teaching.  The Harold-Times, Vol. 115 no. 75.  Bloomington, Indiana.  By Kathleen Mills

36  Shaman's Drum.   A Journal of Experential Shamanism.  The Healing Drum (Yaya Diallo) is more than a literary autobiography:  it includes considerable ethnographic information about Minianka culture.  Number 21: Fall 1990.  Editor of Shaman's Magazine.

37  East West.  The Journal of Natural Health and Living.  The Healing Drum.  Diallo tells his tale with lucidity and poignancy.  It is a story that entertains and opens.  February 1991.  By Anna Bond.

38  Education Feature
Native culture, Firsthand.  For H.H. Langford students.  "My grandfather said: Maybe it's time for lessons...You play like that somebody will kill you, Yaya Diallo." students 5-6 grades.  Langford, Ontario Canada.  January 26, 1994.

39  NY Open Center NYC, NY.  Yaya Diallo African Drumming and Dance from Mali.  Saturday and Sunday July 28 and 29 pg. 48 Yaya Concert pg. 50.

40 The Healing Drum: yaya Diallo MItchell Hall.  A music with powers to heal the troubled soul.  Montreal: The Gazette.  Saturday, May 12, 1990.  By Daniel Feist.  Special to the Gazette.

41  Interculture October–December 1983.  Is Cooperation possible? By Yaya Diallo pp. 9–14 Vol, XVI, No. 4 cahier 81

42  Just Plain Folks 2004 Music Award.  Artist nominee Yaya Diallo Dounoukan Album.  Yaya Diallo, West Africa (Mali)

43  Just Plain Folks 2004 Music Award.  Album nominee Dounoukan, Yaya Diallo, West Africa (Mali)

44  Harrison Festival of the Arts.  July 21, 1988. Yaya Diallo, The people who attended your workshops were very pleased, and the afternoon concert was great.  It was definitely one of the highlights.  Phyllis Wilson, executive director.  Hot Springs, BC, Canada.

45  Yoga LIfe Summer 99.  Published the article killing the Ego pages 18–19 By Yaya Diallo.

46  Yaya Diallo's focus and intent are similar to those of Nada Yoga- the Yoga of sound and vibrations.  The Ashram will be a good place for him to play.  Ashrams had welcomed performers including Ravi Shankar, Akbar Kahn, and Paul Horn.  Ashock Charles.  Toronto.  Yoga LIfe Summer 1999, pp. 18–19.

47  The Heling Drum with Yaya Diallo Concert: Sounds of Africa. December 19, 1999.  Drumming, Dance, and Singing workshops December 20–22, 1999.  Concert and Dance with Yaya Diallo and company December 23, 1999.  Sivananda Ashram Yoga Camp.  Val Morin Quebec Canada.

48  Omega Institute.  Celebrating 25 years, At the threshold of the African sou, Village Voice.  By Yaya Diallo.  Drum and Dance Workshops and Concert.  July 22–26, pp. 56.  Omega May–October 2002 Rhenebeck, NY.

49  Sahell 2000.  Yaya Diallo, The Minianka Messenger.  Bulletin de sensibilisation et d'information sur l'Afrique.  D.I.B. E.C. Vol. 1, No. 3 April 1990.  By Ali Nekaa.

50  Village Awards March 27, 2004 Community Service/Arts, Yaya Diallo; The Healing Drum by the Godfather of Village Awards, Councilman George Unseld (6th District) Louisville, KY.

51  The Midwest Book Review; the Book Watch, The Heling Drum by Diallo and Hall.  Hapa Trade Journal Recordings 0-89281-505-1 CD Vol. 6 No. 1; New Year 1995.  More than just drumming.

52  Jazz A L'Improvu.  Yaya Diallo back to L'Improvu.  March 31 to April 5, 1981, at L'Iroquois.  Place Jacques Cartier Vieux Montreal.  Montreal, Quebec.

53  Jazz Report.  Yaya Diallo The Healing Drum.  Music is essential in Minianka existence.  Together Diallo and Hall collaborated to produce a text that combines anthropology, sociology, philosophy, and music in a potent and thought-provoking read.  Mark Sutherland.

54  Body, Mind, Spirit Magazine.  October 2003.  I have beens searching for an authentic CD with chanting and singing, and now I have found it.  The Healing Drum: African Ceremonial and Ritual Music By Yaya Diallo.

55  Ethnomusicology: The Healing Drum.  This is not actually a scholarly book, but that is part of its strength:  The subjects discussed in part one, about Minianka culture as a whole, are those covered in standard ethnographic studies.  Roderic Knight, Book Review pp. 121 Winter 1991.

56  What if Papageno played the Balafon? in the Magazine Place des Arts Montreal. Music Allows Yaya Diallo to see into souls, to cure madness, among other illness.  Jan-Feb 1990, Vol. 1, No. 2, By Jean Bernier.

57  Mixed Media

58 Mik's Spicks.  Yaya Diallo leads workshops in West African drum and dance in Woodstock NY.  Roots of Rhythm:  Get 50-60 men and women together, each thumping a drum, led by a master whose chops and knowledge go all the way back to the roots of rhythm and you've got the resonance of heaven, the apotheosis of good vibrations.  That's what any serious percussionist or student of African dance can expect this weekend as Yaya Diallo returns to the Woodstock to conduct another series of workshops.  By David Arneir a Woodstock pianist and percussionist, Yaya's Balafon student.

59  World Music Institute Features African Troubadours: Hassan Hakmoun, James Makubuya, Musa Foday Suso, Yaya Diallo at Town Hall NYC, NY.  June 1996.

60  To keep Mali's Cultural roots alive Yaya Dialo drummer on mission to Save Malian Culture heritage.  Monday August 17, 2009.  The Courier Journal, Louisville, KY.  pp. A1 and A2.  By Christ Kenning.

61  He's got the beat.  Glengarry students treated to some African charisma.  Yaya Diallo introduced his drums to Iona Academy on March 8, Martintown Public School on March 9, and to Williamstown Public School, and Char-Lin District High School March 10.  The Glengarry News, Alexandria, Ontario Canada, p. 34. March 23, 1988.  by Lesly Cadham.

62  Sivananda Yogalife.  Winter 2000.  Millennium World Peace Pilgrimage.  The Peace MIssion continues into the 21st Century.  African Music and Dance by Yaya Diallo. p. 9.

63  Sivananda Millennium World Peace Pilgrimage. London, England.  October 25–30, 1999.  Featuring Yaya Diallo, Concerts, Drumming and Dance Workshop.  Sivananda Yoga Centre.  London, England.

64  Sivananda Millennium World Peace Pilgrimage.  At Sivananda Ashram Yoga Retreat.  Paradise Island, The Bahamas.  Featuring Yaya Diallo:  Concerts, Drumming and Dance Workshop. December 25, 1999 – January 1, 2000.

65  American Orf-Schulwork Association, 2003.  National Conference at Louisville, KY.  November 12–16, 2003.  Three events with master drummer Yaya Diallo from Mali.

66 Centre College.  Danville, KY.  African voices festival celebrates African and African-American culture.  Events include and evening of music from Mali by Yaya Diallo, a musician and author.  He will do two workshops, drumming and dance in Vahikamp Theater and a concert of January 14.  Diallo will also talk and perform at a program titled, The Healing Drum African Wisdom Teachings.  Center News January 6, 2011, Kathy Nelsen.

67  The last concert and workshop sponsored by World Music Institute for African Troubadours including Yaya Diallo was on February 25 at the U.C. San Diego; year 2000.

External links
Farafina Donia - A survival school for traditional African culture

1946 births
Living people
African drummers
Malian musicians
Université de Montréal alumni
Bamana people
Balafonists
People from Sikasso Region
21st-century Malian people